Il gioco may refer to:

 Il gioco (comics), an Italian comic book series
 Il gioco (film), an Italian mystery film